Suzanne Horner (née Burgess, born 23 February 1963 in Wakefield) is a female former professional squash player from England.

Squash career
Horner was runner-up at the British Open in 1990 and 1993. In 1994, she captured the US Open title and reached a career-high ranking of World No. 2. She won the British National Squash Championships in 1994 and 1996. She was a silver commonwealth medallist in Kuala Lumpur in 1998, when she competed with Simon Parke in the doubles competition. She won the World Over-35 Championship in 1999.

Her greatest successes were being part of the successful England team that won the 1989 Women's World Team Squash Championships in Warmond, Netherlands and the 1990 Women's World Team Squash Championships in Sydney, Australia.

World Team Championships

Finals: 5 (2 title, 3 runner-up)

See also
 Official Women's Squash World Ranking

References

External links
 

1963 births
Living people
English female squash players
Commonwealth Games silver medallists for England
Commonwealth Games medallists in squash
Squash players at the 1998 Commonwealth Games
Sportspeople from Wakefield
Medallists at the 1998 Commonwealth Games